Meniscopsia is a genus of trilobite known from mid-Cambrian Lagerstätten of the western United States. The sediment-filled guts and the digestive glands of some specimens are preserved, indicating a predatory habit.

References

Ptychopariida genera
Cambrian trilobites
Extinct animals of the United States